King, Wisconsin may refer to:
King, Lincoln County, Wisconsin, a town in Wisconsin
King, Waupaca County, Wisconsin, an unincorporated community in Wisconsin
Chain O' Lakes-King, Wisconsin, a former census-designated place in Wisconsin